Kevin Hogan is an American football player.

Kevin Hogan may also refer to:

Kevin Hogan (footballer, born 1932) (1932 – 2001), Australian rules footballer for Richmond
Kevin Hogan (footballer, born 1934) (1934 – 2019), Australian rules footballer for South Melbourne and sports broadcaster
Kevin Hogan (politician) (born 1963), Australian National Party politician